Alfred John Schofield (born 1873) was an English footballer.

Schofield came to Manchester United in 1900 from Everton as a replacement for William Bryant. He went on to score 35 goals in 179 games for United before retiring in 1906.

External links
 Statistics at MUFCinfo

1873 births
English footballers
Manchester United F.C. players
Year of death missing
Footballers from Liverpool
English Football League players
Association football outside forwards